The North Lindsey Light Railway (NLLR) was a light railway in North Lincolnshire.  It was later absorbed by the Great Central Railway and later, on grouping, it passed to the London and North Eastern Railway. The railway is now mostly closed.

Route 

The NLLR was connected to the Great Central, first by a connection into the goods yard facing towards Grimsby, and then, in 1913, by a further line forming a triangle facing towards Keadby. The line passed through Winterton and Thealby, West Halton and Winteringham; it was later extended to reach Whitton. An additional station for goods was opened at Normanby Park to deal with traffic to John Lysaghts works nearby.

The ceremonial first sod was cut at Thealby by Sir Berkeley Sheffield on 7 January 1901. The line opened in stages, Scunthorpe to Winterton in 1906, then on to Winteringham in 1907 and finally to Whitton in 1910.

Passenger services ended in 1925 and the line from Winteringham to Whitton closed in 1951.  Part of the line still exists at the Scunthorpe end and is used to access a landfill site near Roxby which receives trainloads of household rubbish from various locations in the Greater Manchester area.

There were docks on the banks of the Humber Estuary at Winteringham Haven.

History 
The line was backed and operated by the Great Central Railway; its strategic importance to them was to prevent the Lancashire and Yorkshire Railway from encroaching into their territory by crossing the River Trent.

References

Sources

 

Closed railway lines in the East Midlands
Pre-grouping British railway companies
Rail transport in Lincolnshire
Railway lines opened in 1906
London and North Eastern Railway constituents
Light railways
1906 establishments in England